Caddo, Texas may refer to:

 Caddo, Milam County, Texas, a ghost town
 Caddo, Stephens County, Texas
 Caddo, Wilson County, Texas, a ghost town

See also
 Caddo (disambiguation)